Hitoshi Asada (born December 29, 1950, in Osaka Prefecture, Japan) is a Japanese politician who has served as a member of the House of Councillors of Japan since 2016. He represents the Osaka at-large district and is a member of the Japan Innovation Party.

References

Members of the House of Councillors (Japan)
Politicians from Osaka Prefecture
Nippon Ishin no Kai politicians
Kyoto University alumni
Stanford University alumni
1950 births
Living people